Ayali is a 2023 Indian Tamil-language  streaming television series written and directed by Muthukumar for ZEE5 which focuses on the patriarchal aspects of Tamil society and Indian society in general. The principal characters of the series include Abi Nakshatra, Anumol, Madhan, Linga and Singampuli. The eight episodic series premiered on ZEE5 on 26 January 2023.

Synopsis
The story revolves around the life of a young teenage girl (Tamizhselvi) who defies the horrible 500-year-old customs and traditions that oppress the women of Veerappannai village in Pudukkottai towards her dream of becoming a doctor.

Cast
 Abi Nakshathra as Tamizhselvi
 Anumol as Kuruvammal
 Madhan as Thavasi
 Linga as Sakthivel
 Singampuli as Thiruppathi
 TSR -Dharmaraj
 Lovelyn Chandrasekar as Mythili
 Gayathri Thara
 Pragadheeswaran
 Jenson
 Rajamani Melodi
 Goutham
 Reshmi
 Muthupandi

Guest appearance
 Lakshmi Priya as Inspector 
 Smruthi Venkat as English Teacher
 Bagavathi Perumal as M.L.A
 Kodangi Vadivelu

Development

Production
The series is produced by Kushmavathi under the production house of Estrella Stories, with music composed by Revaa and screenplay and dialogues by Veenai Maindhan, Sachin, and Muthu Kumar.

Muthukumar marked his web series debut with this series.

Casting
Abi Nakshatra was cast in the female lead role as Tamizhselvi. Malayalam film Actress Anumol was cast as a Tamizhselvi's mother. Madhan, Linga and Singampuli were also selected for supporting roles. Bagavathi Perumal, Lakshmi Priya and Smruthi Venkat also appear as guest stars.

Release
It was announced on Wednesday 26 January 2023 that the series will be released in Tamil and Telugu languages on ZEE5.

Episodes

Season 1

Reception

Critical response 
Anusha Sundar of The New Indian Express wrote "Ayali lacks a consistent storytelling. Ayali’s antagonists are over-the-top caricatures. They stick to all the usual tropes of a villain just to reiterate the core message. This repetitive pattern only creates a sense of detachment and a bitter aftertaste. A little subtleness could have gone a long way to tell this tale that every other woman can relate to."

R. Srinivasan of Cinema Vikatan wrote "Ramji's cinematography captures the warmth of the village and the nature of its people without diminishing realism. Starting with the title sequence, Reva's music helps convey the impact of several serious scenes. Editor Ganesh Siva has compiled the eight episodes perfectly without losing interest."

Mankandan Sakthivel of Behind Talkies said "All in all “Aayali” is an amazing OTT series that should be watched by people of all ages."

Janani K at India Today rated the series 3.5/5, stating "Director Muthukumar’s Ayali, starring Abi Nakshathra, Anumol and Aruvi Madhan, is a bold show that questions patriarchy and holds a mirror to society. The show is a must-watch, says our review."

Bharathy Singaravel of The News Minute gave 4 stars out of 5 and wrote "Ayali, despite a few flaws, is receiving the praise it well deserves. It gives hope that the Tamil web series genre will choose nuanced storytelling over trying to stretch out cinematic mass moments for its actors."

Bhuvanesh Chandar of The Hindu wrote "the series raises its voice against the socio-religious factors that are used by men to oppress women, but you wish the series used the long format to maximise its potential and with a better screenplay."

References

External links 
 Ayali at ZEE5

Tamil-language web series
2023 Tamil-language television series debuts
ZEE5 original programming
Tamil-language thriller television series
Tamil-language melodrama television series